The Associate Deputy Director of the Federal Bureau of Investigation is a senior United States government position in the Federal Bureau of Investigation. The office is third in command to the director of the Federal Bureau of Investigation. If the deputy director is absent or the position is vacant, the associate deputy director automatically takes on the additional title and role of acting deputy director. The office is the second highest position attainable within the FBI without being appointed by the president of the United States. Responsibilities as associate deputy director include assisting the deputy director and director, and leading prominent investigations. From 1978 to 1987, the positions of deputy director and associate deputy director were not filled due to William Hedgcock Webster's decision to divide the positions responsibilities between three positions.

Brian C. Turner was named associate deputy director on May 23, 2022.

Associate deputy directors

References

Federal Bureau of Investigation executives